Quiero vivir a tu lado is a 2017 Argentine comedy, aired by El Trece.

Plot
The series is starred by two neighbor families, the Justo and the Romano. Tomás Justo is a former tennis player, with a conflictive relation with his father, and his wife Natalia suffers from problem gambling. Alfredo Romano is a compulsive player of video games, and his wife Verónica suffers a midlife crisis. Wrongly thinking that she was dying, because of a medical error, Verónica reveals to Tomás that she had always loved him in secret, and that she only married Alfredo to stay close to him.

Production
The series started to be filmed both in location shootings and studio shootings, at the same time. The location shootings worked at Victoria, Pilar, Ezeiza and San Fernando. Studio shootings were performed at the Estudios Baires, in Don Torcuato.

Reception

Critical reception
Silvina Lamazares, from Clarín, praises the tone and the acting performances of Krum and Peña. She also welcomed that the first kiss between the main characters took place in the first episode, instead of being delayed as in other telenovelas. She also praised that the first episode easily explained all the main characters with the lead characters breaking the fourth wall by looking to the camera and explaining things directly.

Cast
 Mike Amigorena as Tomás Justo
 Juan Pablo Burgos as young Tomás Justo 
 Paola Krum as Verónica Petrucci de Romano
 Julieta Bartolome as young Verónica Petrucci
 Florencia Peña as Natalia Rouco de Justo
Candelaria Molfese as young Natalia Rouco
 Alberto Ajaka as Alfred Romano
 Rodrigo del Cerro as young Alfred Romano 
 Mario Pasik as Eugenio Justo (†)
 Margarita De Luca as Dora Justo
 María Ibarreta as Mamá de Verónica
 Muriel Santa Ana as Marcela Justo
 Carlos Belloso as Aníbal Petrucci
 Alberto Martín as Lorenzo Romano
 Julián Serrano as Pedro Romano Petrucci
 Narella Clausen as Elena Romano Petrucci
 Malena Narvay as Juana Justo Rouco
 Jeremias Batto as Francisco "Pancho" Justo Rouco
 Gabriela Toscano as Susan Cordero
 Jimena Barón as Florencia
 Betiana Blum as Graciela
 Facundo Arana as Víctor Lorenzeti (†)
 Luis Machín as Guillermo del Arco
 Gustavo Guillén as Rolo
 Benjamín Alfonso as Indio Laprida
 Laura Fernández as Fernanda
 Mauricio Dayub as Jaime "Shimmy Valente" Gurevich 
 Lizy Tagliani as Silvia Troncoso
 Darío Barassi as Jorge Redondo
 Maida Andrenacci as Irupe
 Camila Peralta as María
 Manuela Viale as Candela
 Demian Bello as Rodrigo Estévez
 Iride Mockert as Josefina "Jelly"
 Máximo Espindola as Matias
 Maximiliano de la Cruz as Javier Damián "Damo" Gómez
 David Masajnik as Médico de Verónica
 Fabián Arenillas as Douglas Fox
 Federico Olivera as El Oso
 Florencia Vigna as Micaela
 Pablo Svidovsky as Pablo Laprida
 Coni Marino as Laura de Laprida

References

External links
 Official site 
 

2017 telenovelas
Argentine telenovelas
Pol-ka telenovelas
Spanish-language telenovelas
2017 Argentine television series debuts
2017 Argentine television series endings
Metafictional television series